Fábio Souza de Oliveira or simply Fábio (born 14 March 1984 in Campo Grande), is a Brazilian striker who plays for Goiás.

Honours
Goiás State League: 2006

Contract
14 February 2005 to 12 February 2010

External links
 CBF
 sambafoot
 zerozero.pt
 goiasesporteclube.com

Brazilian footballers
Association football forwards
Goiás Esporte Clube players
People from Campo Grande
1984 births
Living people
Sportspeople from Mato Grosso do Sul